Royal Noble Consort Su of the Bannam Park clan (Hangul: 수빈 반남 박씨, Hanja: 綏嬪 潘南 朴氏; 8 May 1770 – 26 December 1822) was a concubine of Jeongjo of Joseon and the mother of King Sunjo.

Biography

Early life
The future Royal Consort was born on May 8, 1770, into the Bannam Park clan, as the third daughter of Park Jun-won, the Minister of Justice, and Lady Won of the Wonju Won clan.

Life as Royal Concubine
In 1787, because King Jeongjo was once again heirless, Queen Dowager Yesun decided to choose a new concubine for her step-grandson, and Lady Park was selected on February 8, when she was 16 years old.

Three days later, on February 11, Lady Park was invested as a concubine of the Bin rank, with the prefix Su (綏), meaning "upright/pacifist". The following day, the new Royal Noble Consort Su entered the palace.

On July 27, 1790, she gave birth to a son, Yi Gong (이공), who was appointed as Crown Prince in 1800, at the age of 10.

On March 1, 1793, Lady Park gave birth to Princess Sukseon (숙선옹주).

Su-bin was described as gentle, well-behaved and courteous. She was also usually taciturn and lived simply. As a result, she was greatly admired as "a benevolent concubine" (賢嬪).

She is the only concubine in Joseon's history who lived long enough to see her son ascend the throne.

Death and burial
On December 26, 1822, Royal Noble Consort Su died at Bogyeongdang Hall, in Changdeok Palace.

Originally, she was buried in Dongdaemun District, Seoul, but in 1855 (the 6th year of King Cheoljong's reign), when Illeung, the tomb of King Sunjo, was moved to another location, her tomb was also moved to Sungangwon. In the 14th year of King Cheoljong's reign, it was moved again to its current place (in Namyangju, Gyeonggi Province), because the location of the Sungangwon was reportedly not good, according to Feng Shui. The tomb is known as Hwigyeongwon.

Her ancestral tablet is enshrined in Chilgung (or the "Palace of Seven Royal Concubines"). Because of this, she is also known as Lady Gasun (가순궁, 嘉順宮) or Lady Gyeongu (경우궁, 景祐宮).

Posthumously, Lady Park was firstly honoured as Hyeonmok Subin (현목수빈), but in 1901, during the 5th year of Emperor Gwangmu's reign, her title was changed to Hyeonmok Subi (현목수비).

Family
 Father: Park Jun-won (1739 – 1807) (박준원)
 Grandfather: Park Sa-seok (1713 – 1774) (박사석)
 Grandmother: Lady Yu of the Gigye Yu clan (기계 유씨)
 Mother: Lady Won of the Wonju Won clan (1740 – 1783) (원주 원씨)
 Grandfather: Won Kyung-yu (원경유)
 Grandmother: Lady Yun of the Haepyeong Yun clan (해평 윤씨)
 Husband: Yi San, King Jeongjo of Joseon (28 October 1752 – 18 August 1800) (이산 조선 정조)
 Son: Yi Gong, King Sunjo of Joseon (29 July 1790 – 13 December 1834) (이공 조선 순조)
 Daughter-in-law: Queen Sunwon of the Andong Kim clan (8 June 1789 – 21 September 1857) (순원왕후 안동 김씨)
 Daughter: Princess Sukseon (1 March 1793 – 7 June 1836) (숙선옹주)
 Son-in-law: Hong Hyeon-ju (1793 – 1865) (홍현주)

References 

18th-century Korean people
1770 births
1822 deaths
Royal consorts of the Joseon dynasty
18th-century Korean women